The Royal Moroccan Ice Hockey Federation is the governing body of ice hockey in Morocco.

See also
Morocco national ice hockey team

External links
International Ice Hockey Federation
Fédération Royale Marocaine de Hockey sur Glace

Ice hockey governing bodies in Africa
International Ice Hockey Federation members
Ice Hockey